The men's free system team was an artistic gymnastics event held as part of the 1920 Summer Olympics gymnastics programme. It was the second and final appearance of the event, which was one of three team gymnastics events held in 1920 (along with the all-around team event and the Swedish system team event). Two teams competed, for a total of 46 gymnasts. Denmark won the gold medal in this event.

Results

References

Sources
 
 

Gymnastics at the 1920 Summer Olympics